Team Bahrain Victorious is a UCI WorldTeam cycling team from Bahrain which was founded in 2017. Its title sponsor is the government of Bahrain.

History 
The idea for a Bahrain pro cycling team was started in August 2016 by Sheikh Nasser bin Hamad Al Khalifa. The team is financed by the government of Bahrain to promote the country worldwide.

Doping
On 5 September 2018, the UCI announced that an out-of-competition test had resulted in an adverse analytical finding of erythropoietin in a sample collected 31 July 2018. Kanstantsin Sivtsov was provisionally suspended pending the result of any B sample test.

Following Stage 17 of the 2021 Tour de France, French police raided the team's hotel and bus on the suspicion of doping. The Police confirmed they conducted the raids and have the riders' training files in their possession, and "A preliminary enquiry has been opened to see if there has been, or not, acquisition, transport or possession of banned substances".

On 27 June 2022, four days before the first stage of the 2022 Tour de France, Europol raided residences of several Team Bahrain Victorious staff and riders in several countries including Slovenia, Poland, and Spain. The team stated that the raids were directly linked to the hotel searches that took place at the previous year’s Tour, while Matej Mohorič and Jan Tratnik denied that their properties had been searched.

Team roster

Major wins

National champions
2017
 Ethiopia Time Trial, Tsgabu Grmay
2018
 Spain Road Race, Gorka Izagirre
 Slovenia Road Race, Matej Mohorič
2019
 Taiwan Time Trial, Chun Kai Feng
 Ukrainian Time Trial, Mark Padun
 Slovenia Road Race, Domen Novak
2020
 Spain Time Trial, Pello Bilbao
2021
 Slovenia Time Trial, Jan Tratnik
 Italy Road Race, Sonny Colbrelli
 Slovenia Road Race, Matej Mohorič
 European Road Race, Sonny Colbrelli
 Taiwan Road Race, Chun Kai Feng
2022
 Bahrain Road Race, Ahmed Madan
 Slovenia Time Trial, Jan Tratnik
 Japan Road Race, Yukiya Arashiro

References

Notations

External links

 
Cycling teams established in 2017
Cycling teams based in Bahrain
UCI WorldTeams
2017 establishments in Bahrain